CNBC is an American business news television channel, formerly called Consumer News and Business Channel until 1991.

CNBC may also refer to:

Organisations
 Commercial Neutral Broadcasting Company, a pirate radio station from the Netherlands (1960–1961)
 Canadian Neutron Beam Centre, a national centre for materials research using neutrons
 Centre for Neuroscience and Cell Biology, a bioscience and biomedicine research institute of the University of Coimbra, Portugal
 Center for the Neural Basis of Cognition, a joint Carnegie Mellon University/University of Pittsburgh research center in Pittsburgh, PA, US; See Peter K. Machamer

See also
 List of CNBC channels, for all international channels

it:NBC Universal TV Networks Distribution#CNBC